Robert Brock Nunnery (December 28, 1933 – May 15, 1988) was an American football tackle who played one season with the Dallas Texans of the American Football League. He was drafted by the Detroit Lions in the twelfth round of the 1956 NFL Draft. He played college football at Louisiana State University and attended Summit High School in Summit, Mississippi.

References

External links
Just Sports Stats

1933 births
1988 deaths
Players of American football from Mississippi
American football tackles
LSU Tigers football players
Dallas Texans (AFL) players
People from McComb, Mississippi